Martin Dobrotka (born 22 January 1985) is a Slovak professional footballer who plays as a centre-back for Arka Gdynia.

He is well known for scoring hand goal on 23 April 2011, remarkably similar to Maradona's 'Hand of God' goal against England in the 1986 World Cup. He scored with his hand after free kick of his team ŠK Slovan Bratislava in an away league match against FC Nitra in 89th minute and it turned out to be winning goal (result 0:1).

Club career
Dobrotka spent a year and a half in the Czech Gambrinus liga with SK Dynamo České Budějovice and also one season in FC Rimavská Sobota.

International career
He made his first appearance Slovakia national team on 11 February 2009 against Cyprus in Limassol.

Honours
Slovak Superliga (1):
2009

References

External links
 

1985 births
Living people
Footballers from Bratislava
Slovak footballers
Slovak expatriate footballers
Slovakia international footballers
Slovakia youth international footballers
Slovak Super Liga players
Czech First League players
Czech National Football League players
I liga players
MŠK Rimavská Sobota players
ŠK Slovan Bratislava players
MFK Skalica players
FC ViOn Zlaté Moravce players
Stal Mielec players
SK Dynamo České Budějovice players
SK Slavia Prague players
FC Baník Ostrava players
FK Baník Sokolov players
Wigry Suwałki players
Arka Gdynia players
Association football defenders
Slovak expatriate sportspeople in the Czech Republic
Slovak expatriate sportspeople in Poland
Expatriate footballers in the Czech Republic
Expatriate footballers in Poland